Johnston Glacier is a glacier flowing in a southeasterly direction along the north side of Mount Owen to the head of Nantucket Inlet, on the east coast of Palmer Land, Antarctica. It was discovered by the Ronne Antarctic Research Expedition, 1947–48, under Finn Ronne, who named it for Freeborn Johnston of the Department of Terrestrial Magnetism at the Carnegie Institute, Washington, D.C., in recognition of his contributions to the planning of the geophysical program and the working up of the results for the expedition.

References

Glaciers of Palmer Land

zh:約翰斯頓冰川